The Jules Stein Eye Institute, founded by MCA founder Jules Stein, functions as the department of ophthalmology for the UCLA David Geffen School of Medicine.

References

Additional references
"Doheny Eye Institute and Jules Stein Eye Institute Fourth Annual Comprehensive Ophthalmology Review Course". Medrounds.org. Blog post. February 1, 2009.
Valliant, Linda L (September 15, 1998). "Jules Stein Eye Institute seeks constant improvement". Ophthalmology Times. Press release.

External links
Official website

Eye care in the United States
University of California, Los Angeles